Marie-Célie Agnant (born 1953, Port-au-Prince, Haiti) is an author who has been living in Canada since 1970. In 2023, she was appointed the tenth Canadian Parliamentary Poet Laureate.

Agnant is a writer of poems, novels and novellas, and she has also published children's books. She is also a storyteller and occasionally appears with the Bread & Puppet Theater of Vermont. Her works have been translated into Spanish, English, Dutch, Italian and Korean. Her books include Silence Like Blood, (Le Silence comme le sang 1997), which was nominated for the 1998 Governor General's Award,  and La Dot de Sara.

See also

Canadian literature
Canadian poetry
List of Canadian poets
List of Canadian writers
Prix Alain-Grandbois

References

Canadian women novelists
Canadian women poets
Canadian poets in French
Haitian emigrants to Canada
Haitian women novelists
20th-century Haitian novelists
20th-century Haitian poets
Haitian women short story writers
Haitian short story writers
People from Port-au-Prince
Date of birth missing (living people)
1953 births
Living people
20th-century Canadian novelists
20th-century Canadian poets
Canadian women short story writers
20th-century Canadian women writers
Canadian novelists in French
20th-century Canadian short story writers
Haitian women poets
Canadian Parliamentary Poets Laureate